CKKC-FM is a Canadian radio station that broadcasts an adult hits format at 106.9 FM in Nelson, British Columbia. The station is owned by Bell Media and is branded as Bounce Radio. The station's programming is produced partly from its own studios, and from its sister station CJAT-FM in Trail. The station was launched in 1939 by the Nelson Daily News on AM as CKLN, it adopted its current call sign in 1967 and moved to the FM band in 2006.

As CKLN, the station was a CBC Radio affiliate until the 1960s.

As part of a mass format reorganization by Bell Media, on May 18, 2021, CKKC dropped the adult contemporary format and the EZ Rock branding and flipped to adult hits, and adopted the Bounce branding.

Rebroadcasters
CKKC-1-FM 101.9 - Crawford Bay
CKZX-FM 93.5 - New Denver
CKZX-FM-1 95.3 - Kaslo
CKBS-FM 103.1 - Nakusp

References

External links
 Bounce Radio
 
 
 
 

Kkc
Kkc
Kkc
Radio stations established in 1939
1939 establishments in British Columbia
Nelson, British Columbia